Sarah Winnemucca Hopkins ( – October 17, 1891) was a Northern Paiute author, activist (lecturer) and educator (school organizer). Her maiden name is Winnemucca.

Her Northern Paiute name was Thocmentony, also spelled Tocmetone, which translates as "Shell Flower. 

Sarah Winnemucca was born near Humboldt Lake, Nevada, into an influential Northern Paiute family who led their community in pursuing friendly relations with the arriving groups of Anglo-American settlers. She is the daughter of Chief Winnemucca of the Paiute nation and the granddaughter of Chief Truckee. At 16, Sarah studied at a Catholic school in San Jose, California. When the Paiute War erupted between the Pyramid Lake Paiute and the settlers, including some who were friends of the Winnemucca family, Sarah and some of her family traveled to San Francisco and Virginia City to escape the fighting. They made a living performing onstage as "A Paiute Royal Family." In 1865, while the Winnemucca family was away, their band was attacked by the US cavalry, who killed 29 Paiutes, including Sarah's mother and several members of her extended family.

At 27, Sarah began working in the Bureau of Indian Affairs at Fort McDermitt in 1871 as an interpreter.

Subsequently, Winnemucca became an advocate for the rights of Native Americans, traveling across the US to tell Anglo-Americans about the plight of her people. When the Paiute were interned in a concentration camp at Yakima, Washington after the Bannock War, she traveled to Washington, D.C. to lobby Congress and the executive branch for their release. She also served US forces as a messenger, interpreter, and guide, and as a teacher for imprisoned Native Americans.

Winnemucca published Life Among the Piutes: Their Wrongs and Claims (1883), a book that is both a memoir and history of her people during their first 40 years of contact with European Americans. It is considered the "first known autobiography written by a Native American woman." Anthropologist Omer Stewart described it as "one of the first and one of the most enduring ethnohistorical books written by an American Indian," frequently cited by scholars. Following the publication of the book, Winnemucca toured the Eastern United States, giving lectures about her people in New England, Pennsylvania, and Washington, D.C. She returned to the West, founding a private school for Native American children in Lovelock, Nevada.

Since the late 20th century, scholars have paid renewed attention to Winnemucca for her accomplishments. In 1993, she was inducted posthumously into the Nevada Writers Hall of Fame. In 2005, the state of Nevada contributed a statue of her by sculptor Benjamin Victor to the National Statuary Hall Collection in the U.S. Capitol.

Winnemucca's legacy has been controversial. Some biographers have wished to remember her primarily for her activism and social work to better the conditions for her people, while others have criticized her for her tendency to exaggerate her social status among the Paiute. Among the Paiute, her assistance to the US military at a time when they were at war with the Paiute has been criticized, as has her advocacy for assimilation of Natives to Anglo-American culture. Still, Paiute have also recognized her social work and activism for Indigenous rights.

Early life and education
Born "somewhere near 1844" at Humboldt Lake in what is now western Nevada, Sarah Winnemucca was the daughter of Winnemucca (Poito), a Shoshone who had joined the Paiute through marriage, and his wife Tuboitonie. Sarah had an older sister Mary, younger brother Natchez, and sister Elma. (Although Sarah later said that her father was chief of all of the Northern Paiute, the Paiute had no such centralized leadership. Her father, though influential, was the war chief of a small band of about 150 people.) The town of Winnemucca, Nevada was named after her father. She was first introduced to white people at the age of six when her grandfather invited her to come to California.

Sarah's grandfather, Tru-ki-zo or Truckee (meaning "good" in the Paiute language, or derived from Tro-kay, which means "hello" ), had established positive relations with the European Americans who started exploring in the area. He guided Captain John C. Frémont during his 1843–45 survey and map-making expedition across the Great Basin to California. Later, Truckee fought in the Mexican–American War (1846–1848), earning many white friends and leading the way for his extended family's relationships with European Americans.

At the age of six, Sarah traveled with her family to near Stockton, California, where the adults worked in the cattle industry. In 1857, their grandfather arranged for Sarah (then 13) and her sister Elma to live and work in the household of William Ormsby and his wife; he had a hotel and was a civic leader of Carson City, Nevada. The couple wanted a companion for their daughter, Lizzie. The Winnemucca girls also did domestic work in the house. They had a chance to improve their English and learn more about European-American ways. Sarah particularly began to be at ease in going back and forth between Paiute and European-American culture. She was one of the few Paiute in Nevada who knew how to read and write English, and her family all spoke English.

Pyramid Lake War and stage

With the decreasing pressure of new migrants in the region attracted to the Washoe silver finds, Old Winnemucca arranged in 1859 to have his daughters returned to him again in Nevada. In 1860, open conflict occurred. The Paiute had killed two men who had kidnapped and abused two Paiute girls. Settlers and miners organized a militia, making Major Ormsby lead it by default. He was killed by the Paiute in a disciplined confrontation in the first event of the Pyramid Lake War. Settlers were alarmed at how well the Paiute fought and the ill-prepared miners could not hold their own. The Paiute and whites reached a truce by the end of the summer. Young Winnemucca, Sarah's cousin, led the Paiute as a war chief by then. In October 1860, their grandfather Truckee died of a tarantula bite.

As a mark of development, Nevada was established as a distinct US Territory, and James W. Nye was appointed as its first governor. When he came to the territory, he went to the Pyramid Lake Reservation, where he met Old Winnemucca, Young Winnemucca and the Paiute, who put on a grand display. For the next five years (1860–1865), Sarah and her family frequently traveled away from the reservation, performing on stage, either in Virginia City, Nevada at Maguire's Opera House, or in San Francisco. They were billed as the "Paiute Royal Family." By this time, her father had taken a second, younger wife, with whom he had a young son.

In Nevada, US forces repeatedly acted against Native Americans to "remind them of who was in charge." The Natives were repeatedly accused of raids and cattle stealing. In 1865 Captain Almond B. Wells led a Nevada Volunteer cavalry in indiscriminate raids across the northern part of the state, attacking Paiute bands. While Sarah and her father were in Dayton, Nevada, Wells and his men attacked Old Winnemucca's camp, killing 29 of the 30 persons in the band, who were old men, women and children.

The chief's two wives (including Sarah's mother) and infant son were killed. Although Sarah's sister Mary escaped from camp, she died later that winter due to the severe conditions. Her younger sister Elma was out of the area, as she had been adopted by a French family in Marysville, California. There Elma Winnemucca married John Smith, a white man, and moved with him to a white community in Montana and, later, Idaho.

In 1868 about 490 Paiute survivors moved to a military camp, which became known as Fort McDermitt, on the Nevada–Oregon border. They sought protection from the US Army against the Nevada Volunteers. In 1872 the federal government established the Malheur Reservation in eastern Oregon, designated by President Ulysses S. Grant for the Northern Paiute and Bannock peoples in the area. Three bands of Paiute moved there at the time. In 1875, Sarah, her brother Natchez and his family, and their father Old Winnemucca moved there, too.

Teaching and interpreter
At 27, Sarah began working in the Bureau of Indian Affairs at Fort McDermitt in 1871 as an interpreter. Winnemucca was invited to work as the interpreter at the Malheur Reservation by Indian Agent Samuel B. Parrish. She found in observing Parrish that he worked well with the Paiute; he encouraged them in learning some new ways and helped them plant crops that could support the people, establishing a well-managed agricultural program. He had a school built at the reservation, and Sarah became an assistant teacher.

Marriage and family
Sarah married Edward Bartlett, a former First Lieutenant in the Army, on 29 January 1872 at Salt Lake City, Utah. He abandoned her, and she returned to Camp McDermitt. In 1876, after having moved to Malheur Reservation, she got a divorce and filed to take back her name of Winnemucca, which the court granted. In the divorce decree, Sarah stated what she did to support herself when her husband left her with no money, writing, "I did sewing. I made gloves for a living." Her grandfather was a chief of the Piute nation.

Bannock War
After four years, Parrish was replaced in the summer of 1876 by agent William V. Rinehart. The Paiute were sorry to see Parrish leave.

A proponent of extermination-style warfare, Rinehart emphasized keeping the Paiute under his thumb. He reversed many of the policies that Parrish had initiated, telling the Paiute the reservation land belonged to the government. He failed to pay their workers for agricultural labor in communal fields, and alienated many tribal leaders. Conditions at the Malheur Reservation quickly became intolerable.

In her 1883 book, Winnemucca recounted that Rinehart sold supplies intended for the Paiute people to local whites. Much of the good land on the reservation was illegally expropriated by white settlers. In 1878, virtually all of the Paiute and Bannock people left the reservation because of these abuses and their difficulties in living. The Bannock from southern Idaho had left the Fort Hall Reservation due to similar problems. They moved west, raiding isolated white settlements in southern Oregon and northern Nevada, triggering the Bannock War (1878). The degree to which Northern Paiute people participated with the Bannock is unclear. Winnemucca wrote that she and several other Paiute families were held hostage by the Bannock during the war.

During the Bannock War, Winnemucca worked as a translator for General Oliver O. Howard of the U.S. Army, whom she had met during his visit to the reservation; she also acted as a scout and messenger. According to her account, the Bannock warriors and the Army soldiers liked each other so much that they rarely shot to kill. For whatever reason, casualties were relatively few. Winnemucca was highly regarded by the officers she worked for, and she included letters of recommendation from several of them in her 1883 book. Impressed by many of the officers, Winnemucca began to support the US Army's position to have the military take over administration of the Indian reservations, rather than political appointees. (Note: After the 1870 Marias Massacre by US Army forces in Montana, President Grant had promoted a peace policy, appointing Quaker leaders as Indian agents to reservations and intending to eradicate problems of corruption that way.)

Move to Yakama Reservation

Following the Bannock War, the Northern Paiute bands were ordered from Nevada to the Yakama Indian Reservation (in eastern Washington Territory), where they endured great deprivation. A total of 543 Paiute were interned in what has been described as a "concentration camp."

Winnemucca accompanied them to serve as a translator. Since she had an official job, she was not required to live on a reservation. Outraged by the harsh conditions forced on the Paiute, she began to lecture across California and Nevada on the plight of her people. During the winter of 1879 and 1880, she, her father, and two other Winnemucca visited Washington, DC to lobby for release of the Paiute from the Yakama Reservation. They gained permission from Secretary of the Interior, Carl Schurz, for the Paiute to be allowed to return to Malheur, at their own expense. Instead, the government decided to "discontinue" the Malheur Reservation in 1879, closing it.

"Knowing the temper of the people through whom they must pass, still smarting from the barbarities of the war two years previous, and that the Paiutes, utterly destitute of everything, must subsist themselves on their route by pillage, I refused permission for them to depart . . . and soon after, on being more correctly informed of the state of affairs, the Hon. Secretary revoked his permission though no determination as to their permanent location was arrived at. This was a great disappointment to the Paiutes and the greatest caution and care was necessary in dealing with them."

  Report of Yakama Agent, James H. Wilbur
  Annual Report of the Commissioner of Indian Affairs for the Year 1881, pp. 174, 175.

Second marriage
In 1881 General Oliver O. Howard hired Sarah Winnemucca to teach Shoshone prisoners held at Vancouver Barracks. While there, she met and became close to Lieutenant Lewis H. Hopkins, an Indian Department employee. They married that year in San Francisco.

Lectures and writing

In 1883, the Hopkins's traveled east, where Sarah delivered nearly 300 lectures throughout major cities of the Northeast and Mid-Atlantic, seeking to heighten awareness of injustice against Native Americans. The press reported her talks and often referred to her as the "Paiute Princess."

In Boston, she met the sisters Elizabeth Peabody and Mary Peabody Mann, married to the educator Horace Mann; they began to promote her speaking career. In addition, the two women helped her to compile and prepare her lecture materials for publication as Life Among the Piutes. Her book was published in 1883, the "first known autobiography written by a Native American woman" and the first U.S. copyright registration secured by a Native American woman.

Sarah's husband had contributed to his wife's efforts by gathering material for the book at the Library of Congress. But he was suffering from tuberculosis, and Winnemucca learned that he was addicted to gambling, which consumed her earnings.

After returning to Nevada in 1884, Winnemucca spent a year lecturing in San Francisco. When she returned again to Pyramid Lake, she and her brother built a school for Indian children at Lovelock, Nevada, in order to promote the Paiute culture and language. The Peabody Indian School, named for their benefactor Mary Peabody Mann in Boston, operated for a couple of years. Changes in federal policy following what was considered the success of the Carlisle Indian School prompted the federal government to promote education for Native American children at English-language boarding schools. Winnemucca's school was closed in 1887 and the children transferred to a facility in Grand Junction, Colorado. Despite a bequest from Mary Peabody Mann and efforts to turn the school into a technical training center, Winnemucca was struggling financially by the time of her husband's death in 1887.

The Dawes Severalty Act of 1887 required allotment of communal lands on reservations to individual households to force assimilation of tribes.

Winnemucca spent the last four years of her life retired from public activity. She died of tuberculosis at her sister Elma Smith's home at Henry's Lake, Idaho.

Legacy
Anthropologist Omer C. Stewart has described Winnemucca's book about the Paiute as "one of the first and one of the most enduring ethnohistorical books written by an American Indian," frequently cited by scholars through the 20th century.
In 1993, Sarah Winnemucca was inducted into the Nevada Writers Hall of Fame.
In 1994, a Washoe County, Nevada elementary school was named in her honor.
In 1994, Sarah Winnemucca was inducted into the National Women's Hall of Fame.
In 2005, the state of Nevada contributed a statue of Winnemucca to the National Statuary Hall Collection in the U.S. Capitol.

Works
1883,  (new edition in 1994)
1886 pamphlet,

References

Further reading
Barry M. A Native American Encyclopedia: History, Culture, and Peoples, (Oxford University Press, 2000). 
Hopkins,  Sarah Winnemucca.  The Newspaper Warrior: Sarah Winnemucca Hopkins's Campaign for American Indian Rights, 1864–1891 edited by Cari M. Carpenter and Carolyn Sorisio. (U of Nebraska Press, 2015) excerpt;  anthology of her writings from her 1864 to 1891, focusing on the years 1879 to 1887.

External links

Sarah Winnemucca Hopkins, Life Among the Piutes: Their Wrongs and Claims (1883). Full e-text online.
Biography: "Sarah Winnemucca", Nevada Women's History Project, University of Nevada, Reno
Voices from the Gaps: "Sarah Winnemucca Hopkins", University of Minnesota website
 

1844 births
1891 deaths
19th-century American women writers
19th-century Native Americans
19th-century American memoirists
American women educators
Founders of schools in the United States
History of Humboldt County, Nevada
Indigenous people of the Pacific Northwest
Interpreters
Native American activists
Native American history of Nevada
Native American women writers
Northern Paiute people
Paiute War
People from Humboldt County, Nevada
People from Malheur County, Oregon
American women memoirists
Writers from Nevada
Writers from Oregon
19th-century translators
19th-century philanthropists
People of the Washington Territory
19th-century Native American women